Trouessartiidae is a family of mites belonging to the order Sarcoptiformes.

Genera:
 Allanalges Trouessart, 1887
 Arthrogynalges Orwig, 1968
 Bicentralges Orwig, 1968
 Calcealges Gaud, 1952
 Hemicalcealges Gaud & Mouchet, 1957
 Neocalcealges Orwig, 1968
 Proterocaulus Gaud, 1981
 Pseudalges Radford, 1950
 Pseudalges Robin, 1868
 Steatacarus Atyeo & Peterson, 1977
 Trouessartia Canestrini & Kramer, 1899
 Uniscutalges Orwig, 1968

References 

Acari